Quesques is a commune in the Pas-de-Calais department in the Hauts-de-France region of France.

Geography

Population

Places of interest
 The church of St. Ursmer, dating from the nineteenth century.
 Ruins of an old chateau.
 A watermill and presbytery from the eighteenth century.

See also
Communes of the Pas-de-Calais department

References

Communes of Pas-de-Calais